Ditched is a 2021 Canadian horror film directed by Christopher Donaldson, starring Marika Sila, Mackenzie Gray, J. Lindsay Robinson and Kris Loranger.

Cast
 Marika Sila as Melina
 Kris Loranger as Franson
 Lee Lopez as Aiden
 Declan O'Reilly as Jake
 J. Lindsay Robinson as Officer Revesz
 Reamonn Joshee as Sideburns
 Lara Taillon as Officer Kerrs
 Lianna Makuch as Glynnis
 Tom Lim as Ghillie Man
 Mackenzie Gray as Caine

Release
The film was released to Video on Demand on 18 January 2022, and on Blu-ray on 15 February.

Reception
Phil Wheat of Nerdly rated the film 3.5 stars out of 5, calling it an "interesting take on familiar themes, with some superb visuals (the lighting used is a particular highlight) and a fantastic synth soundtrack that adds a lot to the film’s atmosphere; and a denouement that made one hell of an impact!". Chris Knight of the National Post rated the film 2.5 stars out of 5, writing that "it feels like Ditched suffers from reverse Jaws syndrome", and that "Here, the furry monsters seem to be all over the place, all the time. Their motivation, when revealed, opens another can of worms", while praising the performances of Sila and Caine. The film received a rating of 2 out of 5 in Horror Society.

References

External links
 
 

Canadian horror films
2021 horror films
2020s Canadian films
2021 directorial debut films